This is a List of World Juniors and Youth Championships medalists in sailing

World Sailing - Youth Sailing World Championships

29er

Open

Boys

Girls

420

Boys

Girls

470

Byte

Europe

Fireball

Flipper

Hobie 16

Laser

Laser Radial

Boys

Girls

Laser 2

Mistral

Nacra 15

RS:X

Boys

Girls

SL 16

Class - Youth Sailing World Championships

49er Youth

49er FX Youth

420

470 - Open/Male

470 - Female

Cadet

Finn - Open

Laser 4.7 Boys

Laser 4.7 Girls

Laser Radial Boys

Laser Radial - Under 21 = Female

Laser Standard Rig - Under 21 - Male

Lightning

Optimist - Open

Snipe

Techno 293 - Under 17 - Male & Female

RS:X

See also
World championships in sailing
World Sailing

References

External links
Sailing competitions

juniors and youth
Youth sailing